The following radio stations broadcast on AM frequency 1450 kHz: 1450 AM is a Regional and Local broadcast frequency.

Argentina
 LRJ211 in San Juan.
 LRI203 El Sol in Buenos Aires.

Bermuda
VSB

Canada

Mexico

 XERNB-AM in Sahuayo, Michoacán
 XERY-AM in Arcelia, Guerrero

United States

Uruguay
 CX 46 Radio América in Montevideo

References

Lists of radio stations by frequency